Gala Group may refer to:

Gala Group (geology), a series of rock strata in southern Scotland
Gala Coral Group, a commercial betting and gambling company